A Thermal dose unit (TDU) is a unit of measurement used in the oil and gas industry to measure exposure to thermal radiation. It is a function of intensity (power per unit area) and exposure time. 

1 TDU = 1 (kW/m2)4/3s.

Results of exposure

References

Units of measurement